Museo Barracco di Scultura Antica (Italian, Barracco Museum of Antique Sculpture) is a museum in Rome, Italy, featuring a collection of works acquired by the collector Giovanni Barracco, who donated his collection to the City of Rome in 1902.

Museum
Among the works are Egyptian, Assyrian, and Phoenician art, as well as Greek sculptures of the classical period. The 400 works of the collection are divided according to the civilization and are displayed in nine rooms, on the first and second floors, while the ground floor contains a small reception area.

First floor
On the first floor Egyptian works are presented in Rooms I and II. Room II includes works from Mesopotamia, including cuneiform tablets of the third millennium BCE and items from neo-Assyrian palaces dating from the ninth and seventh centuries BCE. The third room contains two important Phoenician items together with some Etruscan art, while the fourth displays works from Cyprus.

Second floor
The second floor exhibits classical art. Room V presents original sculptures and copies from the Roman period as well as Greek sculpture of the fifth century BCE. Room VI displays copies of classical and late classical Roman work, along with funerary sculptures from Greece.
Rooms VII and VIII, show a collection of Greek and Italic ceramics, and other items, starting from the time of Alexander the Great. The final room shows examples of works from public monuments of the Roman period, together with specimens of medieval art.

Artworks
Wounded Bitch, a sculpture by Lysippus, Fourth Century BC

External links
 Official website
 "Il Museo Barracco di Scultura Antica" The Museum Volunteers Association in Italian
 

Art museums and galleries in Rome
Egyptological collections in Italy
Rome R. VI Parione